Antella is a municipality in the comarca of Ribera Alta in the Valencian Community, Spain. It is also a fraction of Bagno a Ripoli, province of Florence in Italy.

References

Municipalities in the Province of Valencia
Ribera Alta (comarca)